Far North Dallas is the section of the city of Dallas, Texas which extends north of the Lyndon B. Johnson Freeway. Far North Dallas is part of North Dallas but is viewed as a distinct area. The area has strong social, economic, and political ties to two inner suburbs of Dallas, Richardson and Addison.

Neighborhoods 
The following neighborhoods are generally considered part of or closely connected with Far North Dallas; however, some of them may not be located entirely within Far North Dallas or may be considered parts of Far North Dallas by some and not others.

 Bent Tree
 Briar Ridge
 Chalfont Place
 Chimney Hill
 Cobblestone Square
 Country Brook
 Estates West
 Frankford Creek Estates 
 Frankford Meadows
 Haymeadow
 Highland Creek
 Highlands North
 Hillcrest Manor
 Jackson Highlands
 Le Louvre
 Moss Creek
Northwood Hills
 Oak Tree
 Oakdale
 Park Central
 Parkway Lake Estates
 Pepperwood Estates
 Preston Creek
 Preston Fairways 
 Preston Green
Preston Highlands
 Preston North
 Preston Port Estates
 Preston Trail
 Prestonwood 
 Regency Park
Renner
 Spring Creek
 Timberglen
 University Place
 Valley View
 Whispering Springs
 Williamsburg on Preston
 Willow Falls
 Willow Greene

Shopping 
 Galleria Dallas

Education

Secondary 
The Collin County portion of Far North Dallas is served by the Plano Independent School District, zoned to Plano West Senior High School. Portions of Far North Dallas in Dallas County are served by the Richardson Independent School District, zoned to J.J. Pearce High School (Richardson) or Richardson High School (Richardson). The Denton County portion of Far North Dallas is served by the Carrollton-Farmers Branch Independent School District, and students are zoned to R.L. Turner High School or Newman Smith High School.

Colleges and universities 

 The University of Texas at Dallas (UTD), part of the state public University of Texas System, is located in the city of Richardson, is adjacent to Far North Dallas, and is in the heart of the Telecom Corridor. UT Dallas, or UTD, is renowned for its work in combining the arts and technology, as well as for its programs in engineering, computer science, economics, international political economy, neuroscience, speech and hearing, pre-health, pre-law and management. The university has many collaborative research relationships with UT Southwestern Medical Center. UT Dallas is home to approximately 31,750 students.
Dallas College Richland Campus, part of Dallas College, is located in nearby Lake Highlands. The campus was founded in 1972 and is the largest campus in Dallas College, featuring nearly 22,000 students. Richland is the only community college to receive the Malcolm Baldrige National Quality Award.
Dallas College Brookhaven Campus, part of Dallas College, is located near Far North Dallas. Brookhaven opened in 1978, making it Dallas College's newest campus, featuring  more than 13,000 students.
Texas A&M's TAMU-Dallas campus (the Texas AgriLife Research and Extension Center at Dallas) is also located in the Far North Dallas. TAMU-Dallas is the home of the Urban Living Laboratory, which is a research and urban lifestyle community built with state-of-the-art green technologies.

Dallas Jewish Community 
Dallas hosts the state's largest Jewish community with population estimates ranging from 50,000 to 75,000 people of the state's estimated Jewish population of around 110,000 to 130,000 people, some large Orthodox Shuls are Ohev Shalom, Shaare Tefila, Ohr HaTorah, and Toras Chaim.

Far North Community
The Far North Community of the Dallas Jewish Community has by far the largest population of Orthodox Jews, the Far North Jews live within an Eruv containing the entire area of Far North Dallas.

Libraries 
The area is served by three branches of the Dallas Public Library system:
 Fretz Park Branch Library
 Renner Frankford Branch Library
 Timberglen Branch Library

Government 
Far North Dallas is split between Dallas City Council Districts 11 and 12, represented by Jaynie Schultz and Cara Mendelsohn respectively.

Politics 
Far North Dallas is very politically aligned with adjacent Richardson and Addison, all three of which voted for the Republican Party throughout the early 2000s. The section has shifted dramatically towards the Democratic Party in recent years, however, voting for Hillary Clinton in 2016 and Joe Biden in 2020.

Transportation 

As the majority of North Dallas was developed in the late 20th century, the primary mode of local transportation is the automobile and the area has a low density compared with neighborhoods built in the early 20th century. Efforts made by the City of Dallas and Dallas Area Rapid Transit to increase the availability of alternative modes of transportation received varying degrees of support from Far North Dallas residents. Plans to build a commuter or light rail line through the Far North Dallas area along the "Cotton Belt" (the St. Louis Southwestern Railway) met opposition from residents and local organizations in the early 2000s. 

In 2019, construction began on the railway plan, now called the Silver Line. Due to delays from the COVID-19 Pandemic, the railway is expected to be completed some time in 2024.

Highways 
  Dallas North Tollway runs north/south. 
  U.S. Highway 75 (Central Expressway) runs northeast/southwest.
  Interstate 635
  Belt Line Road
 President George Bush Turnpike

Thoroughfares 

Arapaho Road
Coit Road
Frankford Road
Hillcrest Road
Midway Road
Preston Road
Spring Valley Road

Air 
Addison Airport, a general aviation airport, is located adjacent to North Dallas in Addison.

See also 

 North Dallas

References

External links 
 North Dallas Neighborhood Alliance
 TAMU-Dallas
 University of Texas at Dallas

Neighborhoods in Dallas